Nils Emaus Nilsen (24 May 1886 – 4 April 1976) was a Norwegian politician for the Labour Party.

He was born in Mosjøen.

He was elected to the Norwegian Parliament from the Market towns of Vest-Agder and Rogaland in 1950, but was not re-elected in 1954.

Nilsen held various positions in Haugesund city council in 1922–1931, 1937–1940 and 1945–1953, serving as mayor during the term 1945–1947.

References

1886 births
1976 deaths
People from Vefsn
People from Haugesund
Mayors of places in Rogaland
Labour Party (Norway) politicians
Members of the Storting
20th-century Norwegian politicians